Wimm Bill Dann is one of Europe's largest dairy products companies. WBD produces yogurt, milk, flavored milk, fruit juices, and other soft drinks. It holds a 34% share in all dairy products in Russia, and a 20% share of the fruit drink market.

Wimm Bill Dann has 30 production sites in 16 cities. The "About our Company" page on the website describes the company's close ties to Russia's cattle and dairy farms. The company's management is both Russian and non-Russian. According to former Plant Manager Vladimir Tambov, the mascot is a mouse.

History 
The business began with a leased juice bottling line and a loan of US$ 50.000. Plastinin and Dubinin invited David Iakobachvili. The first name for the juices was given the name of the company itself: the word "Wimm Bill Dann" was coined in assonance with the English "Wimbledon". The company was one of the first Russian producers of fruit juice under the "J7" brand.

In response to a decline in the census of dairy cattle in Russia, the company spent US$7 mm in 1999 to modernize its suppliers' milking and refrigeration equipment.

The company listed on the New York Stock Exchange in 2002.

The company had been producing the «» «» and brands of mineral water until 2018, when it the plant to the joint-stock company «Holding-Aqua».

Danone considered a takeover of Wimm-Bill-Dann around the same year. It at one time had an 18% stake in the company, which it sold in October 2010.

PepsiCo acquisition
On 2 December 2010, PepsiCo agreed to buy Wimm-Bill-Dann. During the first stage PepsiCo bought 66% of Wimm-Bill-Dann for $3.8 billion. The purchase was one of the biggest foreign investments yet seen in Russia outside the energy industry. Following the acquisition, the company delisted its stock from the New York Stock Exchange in 2011. The deal was completed in several stages entirely (100%) by December 2011 through a multi-stage acquisition from founding shareholders, management and free float. The acquisition was the second-largest in PepsiCo history (after its earlier acquisition of Quaker Oats).

Months following its acquisition of the company, PepsiCo was alerted of possible accounting improprieties by an anonymous whistle-blower. PepsiCo hired the law firm of Gibson, Dunn & Crutcher to conduct an investigation of Wimm Bill Dann, which revealed widespread compliance issues including potential Foreign Corrupt Practices Act violations. PepsiCo general counsel Maura Smith commissioned a memo which blamed PepsiCo's European management and compliance reporting systems for previously overlooking these improprieties, but her employment ended for undisclosed reasons before the memo was finalized. Following these events, the Securities and Exchange Commission began an investigation as to whether Smith was fired in retaliation for her actions.

Controversies
In October-November 2016, the company was accused of using the milk of FMD-infected cows in the production of its dairy products. Following the requirements of the Rospotrebnadzor, Wimm Bill Dann withdrew its products from the market. The company denied the accusations but conducted formal investigations.

Brands
WBD has a portfolio of over 1,000 different types of yogurt and dairy drinks, and 150 types of fruit juices and fruit drinks. Its most recognized brands are "", "100% Gold Premium", "Favourite Garden", "House in a village", "Jolly Milkman", and "Agousha".

See also

Lebedyansky JSC, Russian fruit juice producer
Food industry of Russia

References

External links
 Official website (archived, 18 Aug 2020)

Agricultural organizations based in Russia
Dairy products companies
Food and drink companies of Iceland
Drink companies of Russia
Juice brands
PepsiCo subsidiaries
Manufacturing companies based in Moscow
Food and drink companies based in Moscow
Food and drink companies established in 1992
1992 establishments in Russia
Companies formerly listed on the Moscow Exchange
Companies formerly listed on the New York Stock Exchange